100% Pure Frankie Miller is the fourth studio album by English musician Spike, and a tribute album to Scottish singer-songwriter Frankie Miller. It was released on 8 September 2014 by Cargo Records. The lead single from the album, "Cocaine", was released on 1 September 2014.

Release and promotion
100% Pure Frankie Miller is a tribute album to the Scottish singer-songwriter of the same name. The album includes tracks (discounting "Bottle of Whiskey") written by Miller that were previously unreleased.

Critical response
Louella Deville of PlanetMosh gave the album five out of five stars, describing it as "a stunning tribute to keep Frankie’s music alive." She drew vocal comparisons between Spike and Rod Stewart, saying "if I hadn't known it was Spike I may have thought Rod was collaborating with them." She also noted Spike's duet with Bonnie Tyler, describing her voice as the female equivalent of Spike's. "It’s difficult to tell in places which was Spike singing and which was Bonnie. I doubt even Spike’s own mother could tell them apart!"

Track listing

Charts

Release history

References

2014 albums